Krzysztof "Kris" Matyjaszewski (born April 8, 1950) is a Polish-American chemist. He is the J.C. Warner Professor of the Natural Sciences at the Carnegie Mellon University Matyjaszewski is best known for the discovery of atom transfer radical polymerization (ATRP), a novel method of polymer synthesis that has revolutionized the way macromolecules are made.

Matyjaszewski was elected a member of the National Academy of Engineering in 2006 and the National Academy of Sciences in 2019 for expanding the capabilities of controlled/living polymerizations and developing ATRP, a robust catalytic process for the radical polymerization of monomers. He received the prestigious Wolf Prize in Chemistry in 2011, the Dreyfus Prize in the Chemical Sciences in 2015, and the Grand Prix de la Fondation de la Maison de la Chimie, France in 2020.

Education and career
Matyjaszewski began studying chemistry at Lodz University of Technology in late 1960s and later graduated from the Petrochemical University in Moscow. He received his doctorate from the Center of Molecular and Macromolecular Studies of the Polish Academy of Sciences in 1976 and completed a postdoctoral fellowship at the University of Florida in 1977. From 1978 to 1984, he was a research associate of the Polish Academy of Sciences. From 1984 to 1985, Matyjaszewski held appointments at the University of Paris, first as a research associate and then as a visiting professor. In 1985, he joined the chemistry department at Carnegie Mellon University. He founded and currently directs the university's Center for Macromolecular Engineering. This Center is funded both by an active consortium and government agencies, including the National Science Foundation. In 1998, Matyjaszewski was appointed the J.C. Warner Professor of Natural Sciences. In 2004 he was named a University Professor, the highest distinction faculty can achieve at Carnegie Mellon. Matyjaszewski is also an adjunct professor in Carnegie Mellon's department of materials science and chemical engineering.

From 1994 to 1998, Matyjaszewski served as head of the Department of Chemistry at Carnegie Mellon and assisted in recruiting additional faculty with strengths in polymer chemistry. At the same time, he formed a research consortium with various industrial corporations to expand the understanding of controlled radical polymerization, including ATRP, and accelerate the transfer of this technology to different commercial applications. A second consortium, the CRP Consortium, formed under his leadership in 2001, continues and expands these efforts, training university and industrial scientists in procedures for responsive polymeric material development  and has comprised 60 industrial members. The same year, Matyjaszewski became an adjunct professor at Polish Academy of Sciences and at the Department of Chemical and Petroleum Engineering of the University of Pittsburgh.

Matyjaszewski is a co-inventor on 66 issued U.S. patented technologies and holds over 150 international patents.

One of the leading educators in the field of polymer chemistry, Matyjaszewski has mentored more than 300 undergraduate, graduate and postdoctoral students since joining Carnegie Mellon. He has co-authored 25 books, 100 book chapters and more than 1200 peer-reviewed scientific papers. According to Google Scholar, his work has been cited in the scientific literature more than 170,000 times, with an h-index of 203, making him one of the most cited chemists in the world.

Matyjaszewski has received numerous awards for his work, including the  2020 Grand Prix de la Fondation de la Maison de la Chimie, France, 2017 Benjamin Franklin Medal in Chemistry, 2017 Medema Lecture Award, 2015 Dreyfus Prize in the Chemical Sciences, 2014 National Institute of Materials Science (Japan) Award, 2012 Dannie Heineman Prize from the Göttingen Academy of Sciences, 2011 Wolf Prize in Chemistry and the 2009 Presidential Green Chemistry Challenge Award. He has been honored by the American Chemical Society (ACS) with the 2002 Polymer Chemistry Award, 2011 Applied Polymer Science Award, 2011 Herman Mark Award, 2015 Charles G. Overberger Prize, 2019 Chemistry of Materials Award, 2020 Paul Flory Polymer Education Award and 2020 Nichols Medal. He is a member of the U.S. National Academy of Engineering, National Academy of Sciences and National Academy of Inventors, as well as a member of the Polish, Australian and European Academies of Sciences. He also is an honorary member of the Israeli and Chinese Chemical Societies.

Matyjaszewski's work has been recognized in his native country of Poland. In 2004, he received the Annual Prize of the Foundation of Polish Science, the most prestigious scientific award in Poland, referred to as the Polish Nobel Prize. In 2005 he became a foreign member of the Polish Academy of Science. He received honorary degrees from Polish universities  Lodz University of Technology in 2007 and Poznań University in 2016. He has also received honorary degrees from the Technion, Israel, the University of Ghent, Belgium, Russian Academy of Sciences, University of Athens, Greece, Polytechnic Institute in Toulouse, France, Pusan National University in South Korea., Universite P. & M. Curie, Sorbonne in Paris, University of Padua, Italy and University of Coimbra, Portugal.

Awards and honors

1974 Award of the Scientific Secretary of the Polish Academy of Sciences
1980 Award of the Polish Chemical Society
1981 Award of the Polish Academy of Sciences
1989 Presidential Young Investigator Award, National Science Foundation
1995 Carl S. Marvel Creative Polymer Chemistry Award, American Chemical Society
1998 Elf Chair of the French Academy of Sciences
1999 Humboldt Prize for Senior Scientists
2001 Fellow, Polymeric Materials Science and Engineering Fellow, American Chemical Society
2001 Pittsburgh Award, American Chemical Society
2002 Polymer Chemistry Award, American Chemical Society
2004 Cooperative Research Award, American Chemical Society
2004 Prize of the Foundation for Polish Science
2005 Chair, Gordon Research Conference, Polymer East
2005 Foreign Member, Polish Academy of Sciences
2005 Macro Group Medal, Royal Society of Chemistry
2006 Member, National Academy of Engineering
2007 Herman Mark Senior Scholar Award, American Chemical Society
2009 Presidential Green Chemistry Challenge Award
2010 Fellow, American Chemical Society Polymer Chemistry Division
2010 Gutenberg Award, University of Mainz
2011 Fellow, American Chemical Society
2011 Applied Polymer Science Award, American Chemical Society
2011 Japanese Society Polymer Science Award
2011 Wolf Prize in Chemistry, with Stuart Alan Rice of the University of Chicago and Ching W. Tang of the University of Rochester
2012 Dannie-Heineman Prize, Göttingen Academy of Sciences
2012 Société Chimique de France Prize
2012 Marie Curie Medal, Polish Chemical Society
2013 Madison Marshall Award, American Chemical Society, Alabama Section
2013 Inaugural Akzo Nobel North America Science Award, American Chemical Society
2014 Fellow, National Academy of Inventors
2014 National Institute for Materials Science (Japan) Award
2015 The Charles Overberger Prize (ACS)
2015 The Dreyfus Prize in the Chemical Sciences
2017 Franklin Institute Award in Chemistry
2019 Member, National Academy of Sciences
2019 Corresponding member, Australian Academy of Science
2019 Chemistry of Materials Award, American Chemical Society
2020 Fellow, European Academy of Sciences
2020 Paul Flory Polymer Education Award, American Chemical Society
2020 William H. Nichols Medal Award, ACS New York Section
2020 Grand Prix de la Fondation de la Maison de la Chimie
2022 CNRS Ambassador of Chemical Sciences in France

Honorary degrees
2002 – University of Ghent, Belgium
2006 – Russian Academy of Sciences
2007 – Lodz University of Technology, Poland
2008 – University of Athens, Greece
2010 – l'Institut Polytechnique, Toulouse, France
2013 - Pusan National University, Busan, South Korea
2013 - Universite P. & M. Curie, Sorbonne, Paris, France
2015 - Technion, Haifa, Israel
2016 - Adam Mickiewicz University in Poznań, Poznań, Poland
2017 - University of Padua, Padua, Italy
2018 - University of Coimbra, Coimbra, Portugal

Visiting professorships
ESPCI ParisTech, 2011
University of Pusan, 2010
Lodz University of Technology, 2009
University of Tokyo, Fellow of the Japanese Society of the Promotion of Science, 2005
University of Paris, 1985, 1990, 1997, 1998, 2005
University of Bordeaux, 1996, 2004
Michigan Molecular Institute, 2004
University of Pisa, Italy, 2000
University of Ulm, 1999
University of Strasbourg, 1992
University of Beyreuth, 1991
University of Freiburg, 1988

See also
List of Poles
Timeline of Polish science and technology

References

External links

Homepage at CMU

1950 births
Living people
Polish chemists
Carnegie Mellon University faculty
University of Pittsburgh faculty
Polish emigrants to the United States
Wolf Prize in Chemistry laureates
Foreign Members of the Russian Academy of Sciences
Polymer scientists and engineers
Members of the United States National Academy of Engineering
Members of the United States National Academy of Sciences
Fellows of the American Chemical Society
People from Pabianice County